Kundi is one of the 44 union councils, administrative subdivisions, of Haripur District in Khyber-Pakhtunkhwa province of Pakistan.
This Union Council consists of Sher Awal, Kundi, Umar Khana, Gharhi Maira, Darra Mohat, Sobra city and the surrounding areas.

References 

Union councils of Haripur District